Aminobutyric acid or aminobutanoic acid may refer to any of three isomeric chemical compounds:

 α-Aminobutyric acid (AABA)
 β-Aminobutyric acid (BABA)
 γ-Aminobutyric acid (GABA)